The Painter, The Creature and The Father of Lies is a collection of Clive Barker's non-fiction work, published in 
2011. It includes reviews, essays and introductions written by Clive Barker with new artwork and some previously unpublished material.

The volume is edited by Phil and Sarah Stokes, who run Clive Barker's official website and is published under the imprint of Earthling Publications in three separate states.

References

External links
Revelations - The Official Clive Barker Online Resource - Includes a full bibliography, filmography and frequently updated news.
Earthling Publications

2011 non-fiction books
Essay collections